Clarence Winston Oldfield (27 November 1899 in Durban – 14 December 1981) was a South African athlete who competed mainly in the 400 metres. He competed for South Africa in the 1920 Summer Olympics held in Antwerp, Belgium in the 4 x 400 metre relay where he won the silver medal with his teammates Harry Davel, Jack Oosterlaak and Bevil Rudd.

References

External links 
 Olympics at Sports-Reference.com > Athletes > Clarence Oldfield

1899 births
1981 deaths
Sportspeople from Durban
South African male sprinters
Olympic silver medalists for South Africa
Athletes (track and field) at the 1920 Summer Olympics
Athletes (track and field) at the 1924 Summer Olympics
Olympic athletes of South Africa
Medalists at the 1920 Summer Olympics
Olympic silver medalists in athletics (track and field)
Colony of Natal people